Orange-root is a common name for several plants and may refer to:

 Asclepias tuberosa, butterfly milkweed
 Hydrastis canadensis, goldenseal

See also
 Sanguinaria, Bloodroot